Avaldsnes is a village in Karmøy municipality in Rogaland county, Norway.  The village is located on the northeastern part of the island of Karmøy, along the Karmsundet strait, just south of the town of Haugesund.  The village was an ancient centre of power on the west coast of Norway and is the site of one of Norway’s more important areas of cultural history. The trading port of Notow and the Avaldsnes Church are two notable historic sites in Avaldsnes.

The village was the administrative centre of the old municipality of Avaldsnes which existed from 1838 until 1965.

Avaldsnes has been described as "Norway's oldest capital" because it was the primary residency of Harald Fairhair who unified Norway into one kingdom.

History 

Avaldsnes is believed to have been named after the legendary King Augvald, who allegedly had his seat in the area surrounding the Karmsundet strait. It was here that there was an ancient centre of power at Avaldsnes. At this point, the shipping route is forced into a narrow passage that runs along Avaldsnes. It is likely this for this reason that such power and riches were generated through the ages. King Harald Fairhair chose Avaldsnes for his main royal estate in about 870 making it the oldest royal seat in Norway.

According to legend, Olav Trygvason built Avaldsnes Church, apparently as a manor chapel for the king's residence. This would probably have been quite a small stave church. Construction of the present day church, called "St. Olav's Church of Avaldsnes" was started approximately 1250 AD, on the order of King Håkon Håkonsson. It was not completed until nearly 1320. Dedicated to St. Olav, it was one of the greatest Norwegian stone churches from the Middle Ages and it was one of only four royal collegiate churches in Norway. The church was an important station of the Pilgrim's Route to Nidaros which ran along the coast.

"Written sources indicate that Avaldsnes was the predecessor of the later established Hansa kontor in Bergen", according to the website of the University of Vienna.

The village was selected as the millennium site for Rogaland county.

Archaeology and excavation
Rich discoveries from prehistory have been made in the entire area. King Harald I of Norway located his main farm at Avaldsnes in about 870. In 953, King Haakon the Good fought a fierce battle at the Bloodheights (Slaget på Blodeheia ved Avaldsnes) against the sons of his half-brother King Eirik Bloodaxe. The forces of King Haakon won the battle and he would reign as King of Norway until his death during 961.

This site contains the only Norwegian example of Bronze Age burial mounds lined up in a row. A ship burial from the time of the Merovingian Dynasty (approximately 680-750 AD) found here is the oldest ship burial uncovered within the Nordic countries.

Storhaug
Storhaug (Great Mound), a ship's burial mound, can be found to the north of the royal estate at Avaldsnes. Excavation of this burial mound started in 1886. The ship at Storhaug was made of oak and was placed in a north-south orientation.

Grønhaug
Dendrochronological studies carried out in 2009 show that the ships from Oseberg, Grønhaug, and Storhaug along with the boat found at Storhaug were all built from oak from the same area of Southwest Norway.

Flagghaugen
Flagghaugen (Flag Hill), from the Old Norse word haugr meaning hill or mound, is situated just north of the church. The mound turned out to be Norway’s richest grave from the Roman Period.

Mary's Needle
Mary's Needle, known in Norwegian as the sewing needle of Virgin Mary is the only one remaining of several monumental stones which once stood around the church area. The stone has been somewhat taller, but, towering at  it is still the second largest of its kind in Norway. The stone leans in towards the church wall—the distance to the wall is in fact only . A saga tells that "the day of Judgement will come when the stone comes into contact with the church wall". A popular story tells us about a minister in ages past who climbed the monument and cutting off a piece from the stone when it came dangerously near the church wall.

Nordvegen History Centre
Nordvegen History Centre was opened in 2005, in order to raise the profile of the historical qualities of Avaldsnes. The centre is located by the site of St. Olav’s Church. To best preserve the integrity of the church stemming from the Middle Ages as well as the historical landscape, most of the centre is located underground.

There is a replica of a farm from the Viking Age with several buildings, including reproductions of a longhouse and boathouses on the island of Bukkøy.

References

External links
Norway's oldest royal seat
Nordvegen History Centre

Villages in Rogaland
Karmøy
Millennium sites